Snyder House may refer to:

in Canada
 Snyder House, Toronto, Oldest surviving house in North Toronto, c. 1820

in the United States
(by state then city)
 Snyder House (Little Rock, Arkansas), listed on the National Register of Historic Places (NRHP)
Yewell-Snyder House, Brownsboro, Kentucky, listed on the NRHP in Oldham County
 Snyder House (Bastrop, Louisiana), listed on the NRHP in Morehouse Parish
 Snyder House (Kalispell, Montana), listed on the NRHP in Flathead County
H.E. Snyder House, Columbus, Nebraska, listed on the NRHP in Platte County
John Wesley Snyder House, Winston-Salem, North Carolina, listed on the NRHP
William Penn Snyder House, Pittsburgh, Pennsylvania, listed on the NRHP
Gov. Simon Snyder Mansion, Selinsgrove, Pennsylvania, listed on the NRHP
Wetherby-Hampton-Snyder-Wilson-Erdman Log House, Tredyffrin, Pennsylvania, listed on the NRHP in Chester County
L.E. Snyder House, Onida, South Dakota, listed on the NRHP in Sully County
Fred and Annie Snyder House, Lubbock, Texas, listed on the NRHP in Lubbock County
Wilson I. Snyder House, Park City 	Utah, listed on the NRHP in Summit County
Noah Snyder Farm, Lahmansville, West Virginia, listed on the NRHP
Benjamin H. Snyder House, Martinsburg, West Virginia, listed on the NRHP